The 2018 Little Rock mayoral election took place on November 6 and December 4, 2018, to elect the Mayor of Little Rock, Arkansas. It saw the election of Frank Scott Jr.

The election was officially nonpartisan.

With no candidate receiving a majority of the vote in the initial round, a runoff election was held between the top-two finishers.

Scott became the first elected African American mayor in Little Rock's history.

Results

First round

Second round

References

Mayoral elections in Little Rock, Arkansas
Little Rock mayoral
Little Rock